Kampung Tok'kong is a village in Ketereh constituency, Kelantan, Malaysia. It is about 28 km south of Kota Bharu.

Name
Kampung Tok'kong was once known as Chiakka ("Barefoot"). This likely originated before the paving of the local roads.

Seng Choon Kiong
Kampung Tok'kong is known for its Seng Choon Kiong, a temple to the Chinese sea goddess Tian Shang Sheng Mu (天上聖母), the deified form of the medieval Fujianese girl Lin Moniang. The temple is approximately 300 years old and is a site of pilgrimage for worshippers of Mazu in Malaysia. Lin Moniang's birth is commemorated each year on the 23rd day of the third month of the Chinese lunar calendar. The temple has an association which will tour around Kelantan to perform the lion dance during the Chinese New Year period. It also conducts rituals to dispel evil spirits and bad luck.

References

Chinese-Malaysian culture
Mazu temples
Villages in Kelantan